Ketley is a large village and part of Telford in the borough of Telford and Wrekin and ceremonial county of Shropshire, England. It is a civil parish. Immediately to the north of Ketley is Hadley.

Residential development
East Ketley is currently being re-developed as part of the Telford Millennium Community, part of the Millennium Communities Programme. It will consist of around 750 new homes and some live/work units, a new primary school, some small offices and retail and leisure services in a masterplan designed by Lifschutz Davidson Sandilands.

The site originally consisted of just a small terrace of Victorian houses amid old mineshafts, colliery spoil, a golf course (which was later used as a driving range) and playing fields. Most of the site has been left fallow for many years and some areas have become locally important habitats for wildlife.

Industrial development
Ketley was formerly the home of Ketley Ironworks. William Reynolds (the ironmaster of the works in the late 18th century) undertook the construction of three tub boat canals: the Wombridge Canal, the Ketley Canal and the Shropshire Canal with the first successful inclined planes in Great Britain. He lived at Ketley Hall, a grade II listed building which has now been converted into three separate dwellings.
A small stretch of the Ketley Canal still survives and can be seen within Ketley Paddock Mound, a nature reserve and former colliery spoil tip.

The Shropshire Star is published in Ketley.

Ketley Bank

Ketley Bank is located to the SE of Ketley, between Oakengates and the M54 motorway. It is part of Oakengates civil parish. There is one football club — Ketley Bank United that play in the Mercian Regional Football League.

Notable people
William Reynolds (1758-1803), born at Ketley Bank House, ironmaster.
Samuel Parkes Cadman (1864-1936), born at Ketley, later an American Christian radio broadcaster.
Kuldip Singh Sahota, Baron Sahota, Labour local politician, lives in Ketley.

See also
Listed buildings in Ketley
Ketley Town Halt railway station

References

External links

news on the Telford Millennium Village
https://web.archive.org/web/20070930203210/http://freewebs.com/ketleybb/
https://web.archive.org/web/20080126224237/http://fentyler.pwp.blueyonder.co.uk/rss.xml
Information and news about Ketley Parish in Telford

Telford
Millennium Communities Programme
Civil parishes in Shropshire